National Highway 341, commonly called NH 341 is a national highway in  India. It is a spur of National Highway 41. NH-341 traverses the state of Gujarat in India. The road goes up to the India-Pakistan border.

Route 
Bhimsar, Anjar, Bhuj, Khavda, Dharmshala BSF Camp.

Junctions  
 
Terminal with National Highway 41 near Bhimsar.

Upgrading 
65 km of NH341 is being upgraded to four lanes from Bhimsar Junction with NH41 to Bhuj. Further Bhuj to Dharamshala BSF Camp route is being upgraded to 2/4 lanes.

See also 
List of National Highways in India by highway number

References

External links 

 NH 341 on OpenStreetMap

National highways in India
National Highways in Gujarat